Charles Butler-Henderson (born 23 November 1978) is a British auto racing driver who now works as a racing instructor and presenter. He is part of a family which has strong links with motorsport. His father was a karting champion, and his sister Vicki also races and is a television motorsport presenter.

Racing career

He started in motorsports winning several titles in karting, he moved up to single-seat racing in the 1995 Formula Vauxhall Junior Championship. After time as a test driver and doing some instructing, he was in the Marcos Mantis Challenge, finishing the season in second. In 2000, he progressed to the British GT championship driving a Marcos LM 600 for the Ohana Team. For 2001, he also drove in the British and French GTO championships. In 2002 he drove in the British GT for TFM-GT Team. In 2003 he competed in the Renault Clio Cup, finishing twelfth in points for Xcel Motorsport.

For 2004 he got a drive in the British Touring Car Championship. He drove in half a season for the Gary Ayles-run Team Sureterm, in a Vauxhall Astra Coupe. the year was not a particularly successful one, finishing tenth in the independents cup, and twenty-second overall. He then left racing to concentrate on instructing.

In 2009 and 2010 he had two one-off appearances in the Ginetta G50 Cup with Speedworks Motorsport, finishing three out of five races he started.

For 2010 he was signed by Advent Motor Sport to drive in the Trofeo Abarth 500 Great Britain. He scored seven podiums including a second at Round 1 at Oulton Park and finished 3rd in the championship.

In 2015, he won the UK Mini Challenge championship and was a runner up in 2016.

Racing record

Complete British Touring Car Championship results
(key) (Races in bold indicate pole position – 1 point awarded in first race) (Races in italics indicate fastest lap – 1 point awarded all races) (* signifies that driver lead race for at least one lap – 1 point awarded all races)

External links
 BTCC-Racing Profile.
 Official Charlie Butler-Henderson Website

British Touring Car Championship drivers
1978 births
Living people
English racing drivers
British GT Championship drivers
Ginetta GT4 Supercup drivers
Mini Challenge UK drivers